The 1983 Erzurum earthquake occurred in northeastern Turkey on 30 October 1983 at 07:12 local time (04:12 UTC). It had a moment magnitude of 6.6 and a maximum Mercalli intensity of IX (Violent). Reuters reports that about 1340 people have died and 50 settlements in the provinces of Erzurum and Kars have been demolished by the earthquake.

References

Further reading

External links 

1983 Erzurum
1983 in Turkey
History of Erzurum Province
October 1983 events in Europe
1983 disasters in Turkey